Actiniidae is the largest family of sea anemones, to which most common, temperate, shore species belong. Most members of this family do not participate in symbioses with fishes. Three exceptions are the bubble-tip anemone (with anemonefish and certain cardinalfish), snakelocks anemone (with Incognito goby) and Urticina piscivora (with painted greenling).

The systematics of Actiniidae is often quite difficult. The problem with identification of genera within this family is that most species are readily distinguishable when alive but when fixated lose their color and some other features. Arrangement of tentacles is important in defining genera for Actiniaria families. There may be one tentacle per space between mesenteries or there may be more than one tentacle between each two mesenteries. Members of the family Actiniidae have one tentacle per space.

Genera
Genera in this family include:

 Actinia Linnaeus, 1767
 Actinioides Haddon & Shackleton, 1893
 Actinopsis
 Actinostella
 Anemonia Risso, 1826
 Antheopsis Simon, 1892
 Anthopleura Duchassaing de Fonbressin & Michelotti, 1860
 Anthostella Carlgren, 1938
 Asteractis Verrill, 1869
 Aulactinia Verrill, 1864
 Bolocera Gosse, 1860
 Boloceropsis McMurrich, 1904
 Bunodactis Verril, 1899
 Bunodosoma Verrill, 1899
 Cladactella Verrill, 1928
 Condylactis Duchassaing de Fombressin & Michelotti, 1864
 Cribrina Hemprich & Ehrenberg in Ehrenberg, 1834
 Cribrinopsis Carlgren, 1922
 Dofleinia Wassilieff, 1908
 Entacmaea Ehrenberg, 1834
 Epiactis Verrill, 1869
 Glyphoperidium Roule, 1909
 Gyractis Boveri, 1893
 Gyrostoma Kwietniewski, 1898
 Isactinia Carlgren, 1900
 Isanemonia Carlgren, 1950
 Isantheopsis Carlgren, 1942
 Isoaulactinia Belém, Herrera & Schlenz, 1996
 Isosicyonis Carlgren, 1927
 Isotealia Carlgren, 1899
 Korsaranthus Riemann-Zurneck, 1999
 Leipsiceras Stephenson, 1918
 Macrodactyla Haddon, 1898
 Mesactinia England, 1987
 Myonanthus McMurrich, 1893
 Neocondylactis England, 1987
 Neoparacondylactis Zamponi, 1974
 Onubactis Lopez-Gonzalez, den Hartog & Garcia-Gomez, 1995
 Oulactis Milne Edwards & Haime, 1851
 Parabunodactis Carlgren, 1928
 Paracondylactis Carlgren, 1934
 Paranemonia Carlgren, 1900
 Parantheopsis McMurrich, 1904
 Paratealia Mathew & Kurian, 1979
 Phialoba Carlgren, 1949
 Phlyctenactis Stuckey, 1909
 Phlyctenanthus Carlgren, 1949
 Phyllactis Milne Edwards & Haime, 1851
 Phymactis Milne Edwards, 1857
 Phymanthea
 Pseudactinia Carlgren, 1928
 Spheractis England, 1992
 Stylobates Dall, 1903
 Synantheopsis England, 1992
 Tealianthus Carlgren, 1927
 Urticina Ehrenberg, 1834
 Urticinopsis Carlgren, 1927

References

External links

 Anthopleura sola
 Images

 
Actinioidea
Taxa named by Constantine Samuel Rafinesque
Cnidarian families